is a Japanese fiction writer. Born in Hyōgo Prefecture, he lives in Kyoto.

Writing career
Omae made his debut in 2016 with the short story "Kanojo wo basutabu ni irete moyasu" (彼女をバスタブにいれて燃やす), which was ranked first place in an open call for stories hosted by the "GRANTA JAPAN with Waseda." His story "Yuki no ijō na taishitsu mata wa boku wa dore hodo okane ga hoshii ka" (ユキの異常な体質 または僕はどれほどお金がほしいか) won the second Book Shorts Award and was subsequently made into a short film of the same name, given the English title "Ms. Strangedisposition or: How I Desire to Be Rich." For the story "Bunchō" (文鳥), he was awarded Grand Prize in the "at home AWARDs." Omae made his English-language debut with "Beam," translated by Emily Balistrieri for Electric Lit. Omae's work is known for being "gender-conscious" and often considers the nature of masculinity.

Selected works

Story collections
Kaitengusa Shoshikankanbou, 2017
Watashi to wani to imōto no heya Shoshikankanbou, 2019

Novels
Nuigurumi to shaberu hito wa yasashii Kawade Shobo Shinsha, 2020
Omoroi igai iran nen Kawade Shobo Shinsha, 2021
Shindeiru watashi to, watashi mitai na hito tachi no koe Kawade Shobo Shinsha, 2022
Kimi da kara sabisii Bungeishunjū, 2022

Translations

"Beam." Translated by Emily Balistrieri. Electric Lit. September 2020.
"Bath Towel Visuals." Translated by Emily Balistrieri. The Southern Review. Summer 2021.

References

External links
 The Southern Review Contributors: Ao Omae
 "Interview with Ao Omae" Book Shorts (Japanese)
 "Special Interview with Ao Omae" Mitsumura-Tosho (Japanese)
 "Bunchō" (full text) at home AWARD (Japanese)

21st-century Japanese writers
1992 births
Living people